Michael John Palmer,  (b. 1941) is a retired Australian police officer and lawyer who was the Commissioner of the Australian Federal Police.

Early life
Mick Palmer was born in Coventry, England, in 1941. The Palmer family moved to Australia in 1953 and in 1963 Michael "Mick" Palmer joined the Northern Territory Police.

Policing career
Palmer reached the position of inspector in 1975. Between 1979 and 1982 he completed his law degree then practiced at the Queensland bar. In late 1983 he returned to the NT police as chief inspector, taking the top job as police commissioner in January 1988. Palmer became AFP commissioner in June 1994 and officially retired with the swearing-in of his replacement Mick Keelty in April 2001. Mick Palmer conducted the Palmer Inquiry, an inquiry into the unlawful detention of Australian Citizen, Cornelia Rau as an illegal immigrant.

Between 2004 and 2012 he was the Federal Government's Inspector of Transport Security, a position created after the 9/11 and Bali bombing terrorist incidents to review air, sea and land transport and off-shore critical infrastructure and advise government of the efficiency and effectiveness of existing security arrangements.

Recognition
Palmer is a recipient of the Australian Police Medal and in 1998 was admitted as an Officer of the Order of Australia (AO) for his work in "advancing the professionalisation of policing through the introduction of far-reaching anti-corruption processes and management practice reform."

In 1999 the Board of Governors of Charles Sturt University conferred Palmer with the award of Doctor of Letters (honoris causa) for his contribution to advancing policing in Australia.

See also
 Law enforcement in Australia

References

Commissioners of the Australian Federal Police
Officers of the Order of Australia
1941 births
Living people
Chief Police Officers of ACT Policing
People from Coventry
English emigrants to Australia
Recipients of the Australian Police Medal
Commissioners of the Northern Territory Police